The 53rd Baeksang Arts Awards (Korean: 제53회 백상예술대상) ceremony was held on May 3, 2017, at Hall D, COEX in Seoul. It was broadcast live on JTBC and was hosted by Park Joong-hoon and Bae Suzy. Organised by Ilgan Sports and JTBC Plus, it is South Korea's only awards ceremony which recognises excellence in both film and television.

Winners and nominees 
Winners are listed first and highlighted in boldface.
Nominees

Film

Television

Special awards

References

External links 
  
 

Baeksang
Baeksang
Baeksang Arts Awards
Baek
Baek
2010s in Seoul
2017 in South Korea